Frederick Corbet "Fred" Davison (September 3, 1929 – April 28, 2004) was the President of the University of Georgia (UGA) in Athens.  He served in that capacity from 1967 until his resignation in 1986.

Early life and education
Davison attended Oxford College of Emory University before transferring to UGA in 1948 to earn his veterinary degree (D.V.M.) from UGA in 1952. Dr. Davison met his wife, Dianne Castle, while in vet school. She also obtained her D.V.M from UGA in 1952.

After receiving their veterinary degrees, Dianne and Fred Davison opened a veterinary practice in Fred Davison's hometown of Marietta, Georgia. In 1958, the Davisons went to Iowa State University where Fred earned his doctorate (Ph.D.) in Biochemistry and Pathology, and Dianne worked as a researcher.

He then taught veterinary science at Iowa State University while also leading a U.S. Atomic Energy Commission research project on stable rare earth compounds.

Academic and professional career
Davison worked for the American Veterinary Medical Association as the assistant director of the Scientific Activities Division for a year before being named dean of the UGA College of Veterinary Medicine in 1964. In 1966, he became vice chancellor of the University System of Georgia and the following year was named president of UGA.

Davison served as president until his resignation in 1986 following a successful lawsuit against the University by UGA English teacher Dr. Jan Kemp. Kemp claimed that University administrators fired her in retaliation for protesting preferential treatment for athletes in UGA's developmental studies program.

Following his retirement as president, Dr. Davison remained on the UGA veterinary faculty for two years. From 1988-2002, he served as president and chief executive officer of the National Science Center Foundation, Inc., in Augusta until his retirement in 2002. Dr. Davison also chaired the board of directors of Citizens for Nuclear Technology Awareness (CTNA).

Death and legacy
On April 28, 2004, Fred Davison died from esophageal cancer in Augusta, Georgia and was buried in Oconee Hill Cemetery in Athens.

Accomplishments during Davison's presidency include:
 Funding from research contracts and grants climbed from less than $7 million to more than $27 million during his presidency
 The University budget tripled
 Enrollment rose in all but two years while he was president, climbing from 15,600 to 25,000
 He conferred more than 106,000 degrees, more than the total conferred by all 16 of his predecessors
 The number of faculty increased from 1,150 to 1,850 during his administration
 Funding from research contracts and grants increased
 Graduate enrollment doubled, and the number of doctoral degrees awarded annually rose significantly
 In 1980, UGA was designated as the 15th Sea Grant institution
 The School of Environmental Design was established (joined with the Institute of Ecology in 2001 to become the College of Environment & Design)
 Creation of the Rusk Center for International and Comparative Law (named for former U.S. Secretary of State Dean Rusk, a Davison recruit to the UGA law faculty)
 Creation of the Rural Development Center, the Small Business Development Center, and the Center for Global Policy Studies
 In the 1970s UGA ranked in five national surveys as one of the top 50 research institutions in the country.
 Laid the foundation for the Life Sciences Building, a $32 million,  structure that houses the genetics and biochemistry departments (renamed Fred C. Davison Life Sciences Complex in April 2004)
 At his retirement as UGA president, alumni and friends contributed about $900,000 to endow the Fred C. Davison Professorship, an endowed chair in the UGA College of Veterinary Medicine

The following buildings were opened on the UGA campus during Davison's tenure:
 Alexander Campbell King Law Library (1967)
 Boyd Graduate Studies/Science Library Research Center (1968)
 Psychology/Journalism Complex (1968)
 University Bookstore (1968)
 State Botanical Garden (1969 – 1985)
 Aderhold Hall (1971)
 Miller Plant Sciences Building (1972)
 Family Housing Extension (1972 – 1974)
 Ecology building (1974)
 Library Annex (1974)
 Henry Feild Tennis Stadium (1977)
 Caldwell Hall (1981)
 Law Annex (1981)
 Tate Student Center (1983)
 Second deck added to Sanford Stadium (1967)
 Enclosure of the east end of Sanford Stadium (1981)

Other notable facts/honors:
 Served as Boy Scouts of America Georgia-Carolina Council President
 Citizens for Nuclear Technology Awareness annually awards the Fred C. Davison Distinguished Scientist Award to honor scientists or engineers from the Savannah River Site (SRS) whose lifetime scientific contributions have been exceptional
 American Veterinary Medical Foundation Honor Roll Member

Notes

References
From Ahmedunggar to Lavonia: Presidents at the University of Georgia 1785-1997, University of Georgia Libraries, Hargrett Rare Book and Manuscript Library
Citizens for Nuclear Technology Awareness
Obituary for Diane C. Davison
UGA's Life Sciences Building to be named for President Emeritus Fred C. Davison, UGA Public Affairs News Bureau, February 4th, 2004
Board of Regents
Sea Grant Program Celebrates 25th year, UGA Columns
Retiring has not slowed ex-chief, Ashlee Griggs, Augusta Cronicle, Web posted Wednesday, July 17, 2002
American Veterinary Medical Foundation Obituary
Sanford Stadium Expansion History
 Social Security Death Index.

Davison, Frederick C.
Davison, Frederick C.
Davison, Frederick C.
Davison, Frederick C.
Davison, Frederick C.
Iowa State University alumni
Deaths from cancer in Georgia (U.S. state)
Davison, Frederick C.
Rare earth scientists
20th-century American academics